Andrea Strnadová successfully defended her title, defeating Kirrily Sharpe in the final, 6–2, 6–4 to win the girls' singles tennis title at the 1990 Wimbledon Championships.

Seeds

  Naoko Sawamatsu (quarterfinals)
  Carrie Cunningham (second round, withdrew)
  Magdalena Maleeva (quarterfinals)
  Anke Huber (semifinals)
  Kristin Godridge (quarterfinals)
  Kirrily Sharpe (final)
  Andrea Strnadová (champion)
  Noëlle van Lottum (semifinals)
  Barbara Rittner (third round)
  Erika deLone (third round)
  Yael Segal (third round)
  Nicole Pratt (third round)
  Karina Habšudová (second round)
  Wang Shi-ting (second round)
  Silvia Farina (quarterfinals)
  María José Gaidano (second round)

Draw

Finals

Top half

Section 1

Section 2

Bottom half

Section 3

Section 4

References

External links

Girls' Singles
Wimbledon Championship by year – Girls' singles